Jean Duncan may refer to:
 Jean Duncan (umpire)
 Jean Duncan (artist)